The fifth season of the Cuban National Series saw two simultaneous expansions: in the number of teams and the number of games played. Two new teams, Henequeneros and Centrales, were formed, and the schedule was nearly doubled, from 39 games per team to 65.

Industriales, after two years of dominating the standings, came back to the pack, as Orientales and the new Henequeneros squad, were within three games of winning the title. However, the Lions were able to win their fourth straight series.

Standings

References

 (Note - text is printed in a white font on a white background, depending on browser used.)

Cuban National Series seasons
Cuban National Series
1965 in Cuban sport
1966 in Cuban sport